Berar Province, also known as the Hyderabad Assigned Districts, was a province in British India, ruled by the Nizam of Hyderabad. After 1853, it was administered by the British, although the Nizam retained formal sovereignty over the province. Azam Jah, the eldest son of the 7th Nizam, held the title of Mirza-Baig ("Prince") of Berar.

In 1881, the population of Berar was 2,672,673.

After 1 October 1903, the administration of the province was placed under the Commissioner-General for the Central Provinces, as the Berar Division. In 1936, the territory was renamed as the Central Provinces and Berar, and its legislative assembly was established. 

The successor to Berar, with changed boundaries, is Amravati Division in the Vidarbha region of Maharashtra.

History

Background

Before the Mughal occupation, Berar was a part of the Nizam Shahi sultanate of Ahmadnagar. It was ceded to Emperor Akbar by Chand Bibi in 1596, who was unable to stand against the imperial forces led by Prince Mirza Murad. After this initial victory, Prince Mirza Murad settled in Berar, with Balapur as his headquarters. Near Balapur, he founded a new city named Shahpur, and constructed a beautiful palace for himself. As his relationship was deteriorating with Abdur Rahim Khan-i-Khanan, the commander of the army, Akbar recalled Khan-i-Khanan and sent his trusted friend Abul Fazl to help him. Mirza Murad died in 1598. After his death, Mirza Daniyal was given the charge as governor of Berar, Ahmadnagar, and Khandesh, and Khan-i- Khanan was sent along with Mirza Daniyal. Akbar died in 1605.

In 1611, the southern provinces of Ahmadnagar, Berar, and Khandesh defied Mughal sovereignty under Malik Ambar. Jahangir sent Man Singh and others to crush the revolt. Man Singh died a natural death on 6 July 1614 at Ellichpur. During Jahangir's rule, Malik Ambar, till his death in 1626, recovered a substantial part of the Deccan from the Mughals including Berar. In 1628, the first year of the reign of Shah Jahan (Mirza Khurram), Berar again came under the Mughal sway.

In 1636, the Mughal possessions in Dakhin (Deccan) were divided into 4 Subahs. Berar Subah was one of them, with Ellichpur as its capital, and Gavilgad as its main fort. Aurangzeb was appointed Viceroy of the four Deccan Subahs for the first time, and he occupied the post for eight years (till 1644). He was again appointed viceroy for the second time in 1653, and he remained in that post till 1657. During Aurangzeb's reign, Mirza Azam was appointed at Berar, then Amir Qamaruddin Nizam (I) became the Viceroy of Berar. Berar was successively overrun by the Mughals after the Mughals appointed the Maratha Senapati Sawai Shri Shriman Santaji Bhonsle Seena Sahib-e-Subah, because Santaji was the father-in-law of Mirza Bedarbakht, son of Mirza Azam, and grandson of Aurangzeb.  

In 1720, Maratha Peshwa Balaji Vishwanath had the right to collect chauth and sardeshmukhi from Berar.

Nizam and Maratha period
In 1724, the Nizam-ul-Mulk Asif Jah established the independent line of the Nizams of Hyderabad, and thenceforth the latter claimed to be de jure sovereigns of Berar, with exception of certain districts (Mehkar, Pusad, etc.) ceded to the Maratha Peshwa in 1760 and 1795. The claim was contested by the Maratha Bhonsla rajas of Nagpur, and for more than half a century the country was devastated by wars between the two.

This condition of things was ended by Wellesley's victories at Assaye and Argaon (1803), which forced the Bhonsla raja to cede his territories south of Gawilgarh and Narnala Fort and east of the Wardha River. The forts of Gavilgad and Narnala remained subject to the Bhosale raja of Nagpur.

By the partition treaty of Hyderabad (1804) between Nizam and the British, these ceded territories in Berar were transferred in perpetual sovereignty to the Nizam, together with some tracts about Sindkhed and Jalna, which had been held by Sindhia. The treaty of 1822 extinguished Maratha's right to levy tribute (chauth), the Wardha River was fixed as the eastern boundary of Berar, the Melghat and adjoining districts in the plains being assigned to the Nizam, in exchange for the districts east of the Wardha held by the Peshwa.

When Berar was no longer protected by its Maratha taskmasters, it remained long a prey to the turbulent elements let loose by the sudden cessation of the wars. From time to time bands of soldiers, whom the government was powerless to control, scoured the country, and rebellion upon rebellion till 1859, when the last fight against open rebels took place at Chichamba near Risod.

British Raj

At last, the British government intervened, and in 1853, a new treaty was signed with the Nizam, under which the Hyderabad contingent was to be maintained by the British government, while the pay of this force and in satisfaction of other claims, certain districts were assigned to the British East India Company. It was these "Hyderabad Assigned Districts" which were popularly supposed to form the province of Berar. In 1860, by a new treaty which modified in the Nizam's favor that of 1853, it was agreed that Berar should be held in trust by the British government for the purposes specified in the treaty of 1853.

After 1865, the American Civil War gave an immense stimulus to Berar's cotton trade, as did the laying of a railway line across the province.

Building Berar's prosperity on cotton however came with a price. During the famine of 1900, for example, nearly 8.5% of the population died, "with the greatest number of deaths", according to the historian Sven Beckert, "occurring in districts most specialized in cotton production".

Through an agreement signed on 5 November 1902, 6th Nizam Nawab Mir Mahbub Ali Khan leased Berar permanently to the British against an annual payment of 25 lakhs Rupees. Lord Curzon decided to merge Berar with the Central Provinces, and this was proclaimed on 17 September 1903. Thus the Central Provinces and Berar was born by a Residency Order, dated 30 September 1903, and the administration of Berar was placed under the Chief Commissioner of the Central Provinces.

On 1 October 1903, Berar was placed under the administration of the British Commissioner–General of the Central Provinces. In 1936, with the establishment of the legislative assembly of the "Central Provinces and Berar", the territory was renamed as the Central Provinces and Berar. Berar became known as Berar Division.

Administration
In 1853, after the administration of the province was assigned to the British East India Company by the Nizam following a treaty, it was divided into two districts, South Berar with its headquarters at Hingoli, and North Berar with its headquarters at Buldana. Both were placed under a deputy commissioner. After the Indian Rebellion of 1857, Hingoli and its adjoining areas were restored to the Nizam and the province was reconstituted into two districts, East Berar with its headquarters at Amraoti, and West Berar with its headquarters at Akola.

In 1864, East Berar was divided into two districts: Amraoti and Southeast Berar (which was first renamed as Wun district and then in 1905, Yeotmal district), with headquarters at Yeotmal. In 1867, Ellichpur District was also carved out of Amraoti. In 1864, the talukas of Malkapur, Chikhli, and Mehkar were separated from the West Berar district, and a new district, Southwest Berar district, was formed, which was renamed as Mehkar district in 1865. In 1867, Buldana was selected as the headquarters of the district, and later the district was renamed as Buldana district. In 1868, Basim district was formed.

Berar consisted of one Division with Commissioner and six districts viz. Amraoti, Ellichpur, Wun, Akola, Buldana, and Basim in 1905. It was rearranged into four districts of Amraoti, Yeotmal, Akola, and Buldana. In 1869, municipal administrations were introduced at Amraoti, Akola, Ellichpur, Basim, Yavatmal, and Khamgaon. Later, Shegaon (1881), Akot (1884), and by 1904, four more, became municipal towns.

Officers of Berar Province
 Commissioner - Lt. Col W Hastings
 Deputy Commissioner - A Godwin-Austen
 Judicial Commissioner - J K Batten
 Civil and Sessions Judge - F W A Prideaux

See also
 Berar Sultanate
 Berar Subah
 Nizam of Hyderabad
 Vidarbha

References

Regions of Maharashtra
Provinces of British India
Berar
States and territories disestablished in 1903
1724 establishments in India
Hyderabad State
History of Vidarbha